Erkin Koray is the first studio album by Turkish rock musician Erkin Koray. The album is a collection of singles dating from 1967 - 1973. In 2006 the album was rereleased on CD, with 8 bonus tracks, by World Psychedelia Ltd.

'Çiçek Dagi' (Mountain of Flowers) was originally performed by the Erkin Koray Dörtlüsü Quartet at the Altin Mikrofon (Golden Microphone) contest in 1968, at which, they won fourth place. 'Sana Birşey Olmuş' (Something Has Happened to You) is a cover of the song "Land of a Thousand Dances" in Turkish.  The songs 'Nihansin Dideden' (You are Hidden From Sight), 'Istemem' (I Don't Want), and 'Köperüden Geçti Gelin' (The Bride Crossed Over The Bridge) were recorded by Koray and his band Yeralti Dörtlüsü (The Underground Quartet).  'Yagmur' and 'Aska Inanmiyorum' were recorded by the Erkin Koray Süper Group. 'Züleyha' was recorded by Erkin Koray & Ter. 'Mesafeler' and 'Silinmeyen Hatiralar' were recorded by [Erkin Koray's group] Stop. The group never got to the recording stage. 'Mesafeler' and 'Silinmeyen Hatiralar' were the only two songs from Stop's rehearsals to be released.

Track listing

World Psychedelia Bonus Tracks

References

Erkin Koray albums
1973 albums